Krasniqi is an Albanian surname. Notable people with the surname include:

Adrijana Krasniqi (born 1997), Albanian-Swedish singer-songwriter and rapper
Agim Krasniqi, Albanian politician
Ali Krasniqi, Kosovar Roma writer and activist
Artur Krasniqi (born 1989), Kosovo Protestant Evangelical Church leader
Distria Krasniqi (born 1995), Kosovar judoka
Florin Krasniqi (born 1964), Kosovar-American businessman, activist, politician, and one-time arms smuggler
Gaspër Krasniqi (died 1876), Roman Catholic Vicar Apostolic of the Diocese of Skopje
Hysni Krasniqi (born 1942), Albanian painter
Jakup Krasniqi (born 1951), Albanian politician
Kamer Krasniqi (born 1996), Kosovan footballer
Liridon Krasniqi (born 1992), Kosovo Albanian professional footballer
Luan Krasniqi (born 1971), German boxer
Mark Krasniqi (born 1920), Albanian scholar
Matej Krasniqi (died 1829), Roman Catholic Archbishop
Mazhar Krasniqi (1931–2019), New Zealand Muslim community leader
Memli Krasniqi (born 1980), Kosovar singer-songwriter, musician and politician
Olsi Krasniqi (born 1992), Albanian-born English rugby league player
Rexhep Krasniqi (1906–1999), Albanian politician, historian, and nationalist
Robin Krasniqi (born 1987), German boxer
Vanessa Krasniqi (born 1994), Albanian-German singer
Zana Krasniqi (born 1988), Kosovar beauty pageant winner

Albanian-language surnames